The ace of spades is commonly thought of as the highest-ranking playing card in the standard 52-card deck.

Ace of Spades may also refer to:

Music
 Ace of Spades (album), a 1980 album by Motörhead
 "Ace of Spades" (song), a song by Motörhead
 "Ace of Spades", a 1966 instrumental by Link Wray, released as a single on the Swan Records label
 Ace of Spades (band), a Japanese band

Other uses
 Ace of Spades (comics), characters from DC Comics
 Ace of Spades (novel), 2021 novel by Faridah Àbíké-Íyímídé
 Ace of Spades (junction), a junction of the A3 road southwest of central London
 Ace of Spades (serial), a 1925 film serial
 Ace of Spades (video game), a sandbox building and FPS game
 Ace of Spades HQ, a conservative weblog
 Armand de Brignac or Ace of Spades, a champagne
 Ace of Spades, a non-culinary variety of the Ipomoea batatas ornamental plant 
 VMA-231, US Marine Attack Squadron 231 called the "Ace of Spades"
 Saddam Hussein, the ace of spades  in the Most-wanted Iraqi playing cards

See also

 or 

 Ace of Clubs (disambiguation)
 Ace of Diamonds (disambiguation)
 Ace of Hearts (disambiguation)
 Jack of Spades (disambiguation)
 Queen of Spades (disambiguation)
 King of Spades (disambiguation)